National Highway 166A, commonly referred to as NH 166A is a national highway in  India. It is a spur road of National Highway 66. NH-166A traverses the state of Maharashtra in India.

Route 
Vadkhal - Alibag.

Junctions  

  Terminal near Vadkhal.

See also 

 List of National Highways in India
 List of National Highways in India by state

References

External links 

 NH 166A on OpenStreetMap

National highways in India
National Highways in Maharashtra